The 1997–98 Iowa Hawkeyes men's basketball team represented the University of Iowa as members of the Big Ten Conference during the 1997–98 NCAA Division I men's basketball season. The team was led by head coach Tom Davis, coaching in his 12th season at the school, and played their home games at Carver-Hawkeye Arena. They finished the season 20–11 overall and 9–7 in Big Ten play.

Roster

Schedule/Results

|-
!colspan=8| Non-Conference Regular Season
|-

|-
!colspan=8| Big Ten Regular Season
|-

|-
!colspan=8| Big Ten tournament

|-
!colspan=8| National Invitation Tournament

Rankings

Team players in the 1998 NBA Draft

References

Iowa Hawkeyes men's basketball seasons
Iowa
Iowa
1997 in sports in Iowa
1998 in sports in Iowa